Bought and Paid For is a 1916 American silent drama film directed by Harley Knoles and starring Alice Brady, Josephine Drake and Montagu Love.

Cast
 Alice Brady as Vivian Blaine 
 Josephine Drake as Fanny Blaine
 Frank Conlan as Jimmy Gilly
 Montagu Love as Robert Stafford
Makoto Inokuchi (role unknown)

References

Bibliography
 Goble, Alan. The Complete Index to Literary Sources in Film. Walter de Gruyter, 1999.

External links
 

1916 films
1916 drama films
1910s English-language films
American silent feature films
Silent American drama films
American black-and-white films
Films directed by Harley Knoles
World Film Company films
1910s American films